The Royal College ( al-madrasa al-mawlawiya) is an education establishment located inside the royal palace in Rabat. Since its foundation in 1942 during the French Protectorate, it has specialized in the education of princes and princesses of the Alaouite dynasty. Its director is Abdeljalil Lahjomri.

History
The Royal Academy was created in 1942 by Mohammed V under the French protectorate. The school opens a class for each senior member of the Alaouite Royal family. It previously opened classes for Hassan II, Mohammed VI, Prince Moulay Rachid, Moulay Hassan, Crown Prince of Morocco, the daughters of Hassan II, Prince Moulay Ismail and Sharifa Lalla Soukaïna.

Classes

Class of Prince Moulay Hassan
Some of the attendees:
 Hassan II
 Ahmed Reda Guedira
 Ahmed Osman
 Abdellah Gharnit
 Prince Moulay Youssef Alaoui (son of Prince Moulay Idriss Alaoui, the older brother of Mohammed V)
 Moulay Salama Ben Zidan
 Abdesalam Berchid 
 Mohammed Hajji
 Abdelhafid Kadiri (Minister of Sport in the 1970s)

Class of Prince Sidi Mohammed
The class was opened officially in 1973.
 Mohammed VI
 Fouad Ali El Himma*
 Yassine Mansouri
 Noureddine Bensouda
 Rochdi Chraibi*
 Fadel Benyaich
 Driss Ait Mbarek, Governor of Figuig 
 Anas Khalès Ambassador to the Republic of Ireland
 Samir El Yazidi, Governor of Tiznit
 Hassan Aourid* 
 Karim Ramzi, a photographer and son of former Health Minister Ahmed Ramzi.
Zouheir Ibrahimi, the son of the personal Tailor of Hassan II, he currently holds a high position in the Ministry of the Interior 
Naim Temsamani, was excluded from the school in 1977 (along with another student) because he was good at Math whereas the class was oriented to literary studies.
Prince Hicham Alaoui, until September 1972.
Mohamed bin Zayed Al Nahyan, Emir of Abu Dhabi, briefly until the age of 10.
Princess Meryem Alaoui, attended before the creation of a female-only class
*  joined in 1977

Class of Prince Moulay Rachid
Prince Rachid Alaoui
Khalid Sakhi
Mehdi Jouahri
Prince Youssef Alaoui

People who worked at the Royal Academy
Mehdi Ben Barka, was the teacher of mathematics for crown prince Hassan II.
Ahmed Bahnini, taught Arabic for the class of crown prince Hassan II.

References

Mohammed VI of Morocco
Education in Morocco
Education in Rabat
Schools in Morocco
Collège Royal (Rabat)